The year 2020 was the ninth year in the history of Glory, an international kickboxing promotion. The year started with Glory 75: Utrecht. Glory 75: Utrecht was broadcast through television agreements with Veronica TV, UFC Fight Pass and other regional channels around the world. Glory 76 was available on pay-per-view.

List of events

Glory 75: Utrecht

Glory 75: Utrecht was a kickboxing event held by Glory on February 29, 2020, at the Central Studios in Utrecht, Netherlands.

Background
This event featured the third fight between the champion Petchpanomrung Kiatmookao and top contender Serhiy Adamchuk for the Glory Featherweight Championship as the Glory 75: Utrecht headliner.

Mohamed Mezouari has been forced to withdraw from his scheduled GLORY 75 co-main event bout with Dmitry Menshikov due to an injury. The bout will be rescheduled to a future Glory card.

Results

Glory 76: Rotterdam

Glory 76: Rotterdam, also known as "Badr vs. Benny", was a kickboxing event held by Glory on December 19, 2020 at the Rotterdam Ahoy in Rotterdam, Netherlands. The event was originally planned to take place on June 20 at Ahoy in Rotterdam, Netherlands, but was postponed multiple times due to the COVID-19 pandemic. On September 13, Glory announced the event would take place in the Netherlands on November 7 only for it be postponed again, when Badr Hari announced that he tested positive for COVID-19 on October 19. The event was rescheduled for December 19.

Background
A Glory Heavyweight title eliminator bout between former two-time Glory Heavyweight Championship challenger and three-time tournament winner Benjamin Adegbuyi and kickboxing legend Badr Hari served as the event headliner. 

In the co-main Murthel Groenhart was scheduled to face Cedric Doumbe to unify the Glory Welterweight title, but Groenhart was forced off the card on December 9 with an injury. Doumbe instead faced the former Bellator Kickboxing Welterweight Champion Karim Ghajji, who stepped in on a week notice for this encounter.

The card also featured a four-man heavyweight tournament, with the participants being the #5 ranked Antonio Plazibat, #6 ranked Arkadiusz Wrzosek, #9 ranked Nordine Mahieddine and the new signing Levi Rigters. Wrzosek was later replaced by the #7 ranked Jahfarr Wilnis, as the Pole pulled out due to undisclosed reasons. Wilnis would later pull out as well, and was replaced by the debuting Massinissa Hamaili. Hamaili would himself be replaced by Marciano Bhagwandass, four days before the event.

A Lightweight bout between Damian Johansen and Jos van Belzen was scheduled for the event, but Johansen was forced off the card on December 15 due to illness. Tony Jas served as Johansen replacement, taking the short notice fight against van Belzen.

The card was available for purchase on PPV.

Results

2020 Glory Heavyweight Tournament bracket

See also
 2020 in K-1
 2020 in Kunlun Fight
 2020 in ONE Championship
 2020 in Romanian kickboxing
 2020 in Wu Lin Feng

References

External links
Official website

Glory (kickboxing) events
2020 in kickboxing
2020 sport-related lists
2020 in Dutch sport